Ellis Hughes Griffith, MBE was a Welsh clergyman, most notably the Archdeacon of Montgomery from 1925 until his death on 6 February 1938.

Griffith was educated at St David's College, Lampeter and ordained 1896. After curacies in Llandyfrydog and Carnarvon he held incumbencies at Llangadwaladr and Welshpool.

References

1938 deaths
Alumni of the University of Wales, Lampeter
19th-century Welsh Anglican priests
20th-century Welsh Anglican priests
Archdeacons of Montgomery
Members of the Order of the British Empire